Darja Semeņistaja (born 16 September 2002) is a Latvian tennis player. She has career-high WTA rankings of No. 211 in singles and 256 in doubles.

In 2021, Semeņistaja has won the most singles trophies on the ITF Women's World Tour - with seven titles. She won the first two in Serbia, winning Prokuplje's $15k events for two weeks in a row, then the third in Bratislava in mid-July, the fourth in Chornomorsk, Ukraine, at the end of August, and finally three in Cancún, Mexico in October.

ITF Circuit finals

Singles: 12 (11 titles, 1 runner-up)

Doubles: 10 (6 titles, 4 runner–ups)

References

External links
 
 
 Darja Semeņistaja at the Latvian Tennis Union

2002 births
Living people
Latvian female tennis players